Vyaznikovsky District is an administrative and municipal district (raion), one of the sixteen in Vladimir Oblast, Russia. It is located in the northeast of the oblast. Its administrative center is the town of Vyazniki. Population:   50,692 (2002 Census);  The population of Vyazniki accounts for 51.0% of the district's total population.

References

Notes

Sources

Districts of Vladimir Oblast